The Corridor IIІ is one of the Pan-European corridors. The corridor follows the route: Brussels - Aachen - Cologne - Dresden - Wrocław - Katowice - Kraków - Lviv - Kyiv

Branches
Branch A - Berlin - Wrocław

References

03
Roads in Ukraine
Roads in Germany
Roads in Poland